Neil Bartlett may refer to:

 Neil Bartlett (chemist) (1932–2008), chemist who synthesized the first noble-gas compounds
 Neil Bartlett (playwright) (born 1958), award-winning British director, performer, translator, and writer

See also
 Neal Bartlett (born 1975), English footballer